The El Plata class consisted of a pair of monitors built in Britain in the 1870s for the Argentine Navy. They served as coastal defence ships.

Description
They displaced , and their crew numbered 120 officers and enlisted men.

Ships in class 
 ARA El Plata
 ARA Los Andes

See also 
 List of ships of the Argentine Navy
 List of ironclads

References

Notes

Bibliography

External links 
 
 

El Plata-class monitors